Sharieh-ye Seyyed Abud (also Romanized as Sharīʿeh-ye Seyyed ʿAbūd) is a village in Gharb-e Karun Rural District, in the Central District of Khorramshahr County, Khuzestan Province, Iran. At the 2006 census, its population was 39, in 5 families.

References 

Populated places in Khorramshahr County